Eucrossus villicornis is a species of beetle in the family Cerambycidae, the only species in the genus Eucrossus.

References

Hesperophanini